Qurt Tappeh may refer to:
 Qurt Tappeh, Meshgin Shahr, Ardabil Province
 Qurt Tappeh, Moradlu, Meshgin Shahr County, Ardabil Province
 Qurt Tappeh, West Azerbaijan